Panafieu is a French surname. Notable people with the surname include:

 Bernard Panafieu (1931–2017), French Roman Catholic bishop
 Françoise de Panafieu (born 1948), French politician

French-language surnames